Macotasa suffusus is a moth of the family Erebidae. It was described by George Talbot in 1926. It is found on Borneo. The habitat consists of lowland to lower montane forest types.

References

Lithosiina
Moths described in 1926